The July 13 Penghu incident (from ) refers to the forced conscription of high school student refugees from Shandong, China who had recently arrived on Penghu, Taiwan.  It was promised to the students that they could study while undergoing military training, but the Republic of China military officers (led by the Kuomintang) reneged on the promise of providing them an education.

In response, some students protested the decision, and they were bayoneted by soldiers and held captive.  Later, two school principals tried to report the incident, and the military responded by arresting about 100 students, torturing them, and forcing them to confess as "Communist spies" and implicate the principals.  There are unconfirmed accounts of soldiers killing students for resisting.  About 40 students were brought to Taipei for trial, resulting in the execution of the two principals along with five students.

The incident is generally considered to be an example of human rights abuses during White Terror.  On the 70th anniversary of the incident, an exhibition was hosted at the Penghu Reclamation Hall in Penghu and the Jing-Mei White Terror Memorial Park in Taipei to commemorate the incident.

References 

1949 in Taiwan
Protests in Taiwan
Protest-related deaths
White Terror (Taiwan)
1940s in Taiwan
Penghu Islands